1837 in sports describes the year's events in world sport.

Boxing
Events
 With James Burke now operating in America, attention shifts to the upcoming Ben Caunt and William "Bendigo" Thompson who each win two fights in 1837, but there remains no resolution to the English title issue.

Cricket
Events
 Kent is the most successful team and this marks the beginning of a great period in the county's history till1849.  Mainstays of the Kent team in these years include Alfred Mynn, Fuller Pilch, Nicholas Felix, Ned Wenman and William Hillyer.
England
 Most runs – Fuller Pilch 372 @ 26.57 (HS 84)
 Most wickets – William Lillywhite 99 @ 8.65 (BB 10–?)

Horse racing
England
 Grand National – The Duke
 1,000 Guineas Stakes – Chapeau d'Espagne
 2,000 Guineas Stakes – Achmet
 The Derby – Phosphorus
 The Oaks – Miss Letty 
 St. Leger Stakes – Mango

Rowing
The Boat Race
 The Oxford and Cambridge Boat Race is not held this year

References

 
Sports by year